Specklinia subpicta is a species of orchid plant native to Brazil.

References 

subpicta
Flora of Brazil